The Washington Times-Herald is a daily newspaper serving Washington, Indiana, and adjacent portions of Daviess County, Indiana. It is owned by Community Newspaper Holdings Inc. and presently the only daily newspaper in Washington, Indiana.

History
Although the newspaper's motto is "Serving Washington and surrounding communities since 1867", the paper's history goes back to the Washington Democrat weekly, founded 1863. The Democrat changed its name to Daily Times in 1955; on June 1, 1964, it merged with the Washington Herald (not related to the Washington D.C. newspaper The Washington Herald) to form the Times-Herald, by now the city's only daily newspaper. 

On November 1, 1972, ownership of the paper passed from local families to Donrey Media Group, which held it until CNHI bought the Times-Herald in September 1998.

References

External links 
 Washington Times-Herald Website
 CNHI Website

Washington Times-Herald
Newspapers of Southwestern Indiana
Washington Times-Herald